FC Naters is a Swiss football club from the town of Naters in Canton Valais. The team currently plays in Liga 1., the third highest tier in the Swiss football pyramid.

History

FC Naters was founded in 1958 and played their first game on 16 June 1958. In 1961 the club rose to the 3. Liga (fifth tier) for the first time in their history. At the end of the 1969/70 season the club rose to the 2. Liga and in 1971 narrowly missed out on promotion to the 1. Liga. At the end of the 1978/79 season the club were relegated and so returned to the 3. Liga.

The team currently plays in Liga 1., the third highest tier in the Swiss football pyramid where they have played since 1996.

Stadium

The club play their home games at Sportanlage Stapfen. The capacity is 3,000. The stadium was opened in 1997.

Current squad
As of 12 August 2022.

References

External links
Official Website 
Soccerway.com profile 
Football.ch profile 

Naters
Association football clubs established in 1958
1958 establishments in Switzerland